Cosmetalepas concatenata, common name the pitted keyhole limpet, is a species of sea snail, a marine gastropod mollusk in the family Fissurellidae, the keyhole limpets and slit limpets.

Description
The size of the shell varies between 10 mm and 22 mm.

Distribution
This marine species occurs off New South Wales to Abrolhos Islands and off Tasmania.

References

External links
 To World Register of Marine Species
 

Fissurellidae
Gastropods described in 1864